The 1963 Nebraska Cornhuskers football team was the representative of the University of Nebraska and member of the Big Eight Conference in the 1963 NCAA University Division football season. The team was coached by Bob Devaney and played their home games at Memorial Stadium in Lincoln, Nebraska.

Schedule

Roster

Coaching staff

Game summaries

South Dakota State

Minnesota

Iowa State

Air Force

Kansas State

Colorado

Missouri

Kansas

Oklahoma State

Oklahoma

This game was almost canceled due to the assassination of President John F. Kennedy the day before.  But both schools eventually agreed to hold the game anyway.  It was the only game across the country that was played that day.

Auburn

Rankings

Awards
 All American: Robert Brown
 National Lineman of the Year: Bob Brown
 All Big 8: Bob Brown, Dennis Claridge, Lloyd Voss
 Big 8 Player of the Year: Dennis Claridge

Future professional players
Robert Brown, 1964 2nd-round pick of the Philadelphia Eagles
 James Brown, 1966 13th-round pick of the St. Louis Cardinals
Dennis Claridge, 1963 3rd-round pick of the Green Bay Packers
 Dick Czap, 1966 12th-round pick of the Cleveland Browns
 Rudy Johnson, 1964 5th-round pick of the San Francisco 49ers
 Robert Jones, 1964 18th-round pick of the Washington Redskins
Monte Kiffin, 1964 15th-round pick of the Minnesota Vikings
 Tony Jeter, 1966 3rd-round pick of the Green Bay Packers
John Kirby, 1964 5th-round pick of the Minnesota Vikings
Larry Kramer, 1964 15th-round pick of the Indianapolis Colts
 Preston Love, 1965 19th-round pick of the Detroit Lions
Kent McCloughan, 1965 3rd-round pick of the Washington Redskins
 Willie Ross, 1964 9th-round pick of the St. Louis Cardinals
 David Theisen, 1963 11th-round pick of the Los Angeles Rams
Lloyd Voss, 1964 1st-round pick of the Green Bay Packers
 Freeman White, 1966 9th-round pick of the New York Giants

References

Nebraska
Nebraska Cornhuskers football seasons
Big Eight Conference football champion seasons
Orange Bowl champion seasons
Nebraska Cornhuskers football